Bradwell-on-Sea is a village and civil parish in Essex, England. The village is on the Dengie peninsula. The village is in the District of Maldon in the parliamentary constituency of Maldon whose boundaries were last varied at the 2010 general election. It has a population of 863, a decline from 877 in the previous census.

History
Bradwell-on-Sea was a Saxon Shore fort in Roman times known as Othona. The Anglo-Saxons originally called it Ithancester. Saint Cedd founded a monastery within the old walls in 653, which survives as the restored Chapel of St Peter-on-the-Wall, one of the oldest churches in Britain. From there, he continued the evangelisation of Essex. In the 20th century, the village became better known as the site for the Bradwell nuclear power station. It also has a school, St Cedd’s Church of England primary school and a sailing club.

The village has been called Bradwell juxta Mare (Local pronunciation is same as in juxtaposition and a female horse; Latin pronunciation is yux-ta and mare-eh), Bradwell-next-the-Sea and Bradwell near the Sea.

Notable residents include the Tudor martyr Thomas Abel, the newspaper editor Sir Henry Bate Dudley, the MP Tom Driberg (later Baron Bradwell), who lived at Bradwell Lodge and is buried in the churchyard, and the artist F. H. Haagensen.

The local newspaper is the Maldon and Burnham Standard.
There is a Facebook page called The Bradwell Bugle.

World War Two
During the Second World War the airfield sited to the north-east of Bradwell Waterside was a front-line station, and named RAF Bradwell Bay.  Prior to this conflict a small grass airfield was sited there for refuelling and re-arming the aircraft used by pilots practising shooting and bombing at the ranges on nearby Dengie Marshes. In 1941 the airfield was enlarged, swallowing up the pre-war grass landing ground, and three concrete runways were laid down. As it was quite near the coast, and many aircraft in distress landed there, it had the FIDO (Fog Intensive Dispersal Operation) system installed to help pilots find a safe landing in foggy weather. Many night-fighter squadrons were based here, equipped first with the Douglas Havoc, then the de Havilland Mosquito, the ubiquitous multi-role-combat aircraft of its time. The airfield was also used as a jumping-off point for fighters escorting long-distance bombing raids on Germany, and such types as the Spitfire and North American Mustang could be seen. A recent memorial, in the shape of a crashed de Havilland Mosquito, has been placed near to the edge of the airfield to remember all those who lost their lives in defence of Britain in the Second World War whilst based at RAF Bradwell Bay.

See also
Bradwell Waterside
Bradwell Shell Bank
Dengie nature reserve

References

External links

 The Rotary Club of Burnham on Crouch & Dengie Hundred
 Essex Walks - Bradwell-on-Sea
 Information and photographs of Bradwell on Sea Village
 The history of Bradwell on Sea 
 Bradwell Bay Preservation Group
 RAF Bradwell Bay Facebook group
 Bradwell-on-Sea - Conservation Area Review and Character Appraisal, Essex County Council and Maldon District Council, 2006

Villages in Essex
Maldon District
Populated coastal places in Essex
Beaches of Essex